Platygillellus rubrocinctus, the Saddle stargazer, is a species of sand stargazer native to the Atlantic, Gulf and Caribbean waters from southern Florida, United States, and the Bahamas to Panama where it prefers rubble or sandy substrates around rocky areas and reefs at depths of from .  It can reach a maximum length of  TL.

References

rubrocinctus
Taxa named by William Harding Longley
Fish described in 1934
Fish of the Atlantic Ocean